Taj is an album by American blues artist Taj Mahal. The cover photograph was by Robert Mapplethorpe.

Track listing
All tracks composed by Taj Mahal; except where indicated 
 "Everybody is Somebody" (The Mighty Shadow)
 "Paradise"
 "Do I Love Her"
 "Light of the Pacific" (Toni Fonoti)
 "'Deed I Do"
 "Soothin'" (Jae Mason)
 "Pillow Talk" (Michael Burton, Sylvia Robinson)
 "Local Local Girl"
 "Kauai Kalypso"
 "French Letter" (Toni Fonoti)

Personnel
 Taj Mahal - acoustic and electric guitars, bass, percussion, keyboards, lead and background vocals
 Jeanette Acosta - synthesizer 
 Wayne Henderson - keyboards 
 Ray Fitzpatrick - bass, percussion
 Inshirah Mahal - congas, percussion
 Larry McDonald - congas, percussion
 Babatunde Olatunji - djembe, congas, shekere, percussion
 Ralph MacDonald - congas, tambourine, percussion
 Robert Greenidge - steel drums, percussion
 Ozzie Williams - drums, DBX drum programming
 Kester Smith - drums
 Chris Simpson - nylon stringed Spanish guitar
 Tony Jones - electric bass, electric guitar
 Fred Lunt - steel guitar
 Jesse Ed Davis - lead guitar
 Kenny Lee Lewis - rhythm guitar
 Reggie Lucas - guitar
 Rudy Costa - alto saxophone
 Ron Brown - tenor saxophone
 Fernando Pullum - trumpet
 Larry Gittens - trumpet
 Garnett Brown - trombone
 Duane Benjamin - trombone
 Melody McCully - background vocals
 Pamela Vincent - background vocals
 Joyce Wilson - background vocals

References

1987 albums
Taj Mahal (musician) albums